The Lescarbot Award is awarded by the federal government of Canada to people who have contributed the most to their arts community.
The first recipient of the award was Father Fernand Lindsay, founder of the international de Lanaudière.

Recipients of this award include:
 Judith Budovitch, Fredericton, 1991
 John Cutruzzola, Brampton
 Garry Davies, Peace, 1991
 Lorenzo Bellisconi, 1991
 Joan E. Harriss, Cape Breton
 Karl Illini, Bobcaygeon
 Trudi Le Caine, Ottawa
 Helen Andersen, Saanichton, British Columbia 1992
 Sharon and Clary Croft, Halifax, Nova Scotia, 1992
 Reid Parker, Saint John, 1992
 Fernand Lindsay, Trois-Pistoles, Quebec, 1992
 Dasharathal H. Shah, North York/Richmond Hill, 1992
 Mike Matovich, Airdrie, 1992
 E. Noël Spinelli, Montreal, 1993
 Joseph M. Tanenbaum, Toronto, 1993
 Charles William John Eliot, Charlottetown, 1993

References 

Canadian art awards